Litoral Sul is a microregion in the Brazilian state of Rio Grande do Norte.

Municipalities 
The microregion consists of the following municipalities:
 Arês
 Baía Formosa
 Canguaretama
 Espírito Santo
 Goianinha
 Montanhas
 Pedro Velho
 Senador Georgino Avelino
 Tibau do Sul
 Vila Flor

References

Microregions of Rio Grande do Norte